ARD alpha is a German free-to-air television channel run by regional public-service broadcaster Bayerischer Rundfunk. Its programming consists of shows made by Bayerischer Rundfunk, as well as from ARD and Austrian broadcaster ORF. The channel was originally called  BR-alpha, but was rebranded as ARD-alpha on 29 June 2014.

Programmes
ARD-alpha broadcasts educational programmes including; science, religion, music, philosophy, literature, language learning, art and culture.

History

BR-alpha (1998-2014) 
BR-alpha, as the station was originally called, started broadcasting on January 7, 1998. The station's programmes were originally broadcast in analog using the Astra satellite and were also distributed by cable networks.  The schedule focused  mainly on education and information.  The channel began digital broadcasts via Astra in the summer of 1998. On 28 November 2000, the heads of the regional public broadcasters agreed to start cooperating with BR-alpha.

On 30 September 2002, the channel started broadcasting Planet Wissen ("Planet Knowledge" in English), a general knowledge programme and a co-production of BR-alpha, Westdeutscher Rundfunk and Südwestrundfunk.  The programme also has an extensive internet presence.  Bavaria started digital terrestrial television broadcasts on 30 May 2005, as did BR-alpha.

The channel's scheduled were revamped on 16 February 2008. Career guidance programmes, a magazine aimed at young people called freiraum were started, and programs W wie Wissen and Faszination Wissen were also added.

On 9 August 2009, the youth program on3-südwild switched from Bavarian Television to BR-alpha. On 27 June 2010, Andreas Höfer won the Deutschen Kamerapreis (German Camera Award) in the category TV movie /docudrama for the BR-alpha film Empathie – Stumme Schreie (Empathy - Silent screams).

ARD alpha (since 2014) 
The channel was renamed ARD alpha on 29 June 2014. The schedule was reorganised the previous day. BR is still responsible for financing and broadcasting the channel, but some programmes originally broadcast by other ARD member stations were added to ARD alpha's schedule. Cooperation with ORF (the Austrian public broadcaster) in the form of alpha-Österreich continued, and its television programs are now aired after 10 pm instead of in the early evening.  Werner Reuss is head of ARD alpha.

Broadcast

SD broadcasting via satellite (Astra 19.2) stopped on 12 January 2021.

Audience share

Germany

References

External links
 
 

Television stations in Germany
Mass media in Munich
Television channels and stations established in 1998
Educational and instructional television channels
ARD (broadcaster)
ORF (broadcaster)
German-language television stations
Bayerischer Rundfunk